The Bistonini are a tribe of geometer moths in subfamily Ennominae. As numerous ennomine genera have not yet been assigned to a tribe, the genus list is preliminary. In addition, the entire tribe is sometimes merged into a much-expanded Boarmiini. In other treatments, the Erannini are included in the present group.

They overall resemble the Boarmiini, which are certainly closely related. Bistonini tend to retain more plesiomorphic traits (they are rather basal in the expanded Boarmiini) and contain many species that are very large and hairy by geometer moth standards, somewhat resembling Arctiidae.

Selected genera and species
 Agriopis
 Spring usher, Agriopis leucophaearia
 Dotted border, Agriopis marginaria
 Almabiston
 Amorphogynia
 Apocheima 
 Biston
 Chondrosoma 
 Cochisea
 Hypagyrtis 
 Larerannis
 Lycia
 Brindled beauty, Lycia hirtaria
 Megabiston
 Microbiston
 Nyssiodes
 Pachyerannis
 Paleacrita
 Spring cankerworm, Paleacrita vernata
 Phigaliohybernia
 Protalcis
 Pterotocera

Footnotes

References

  (2008): Family group names in Geometridae. Retrieved July 22, 2008.
  (1994): The Moths of Borneo: Family Geometridae, Subfamily Ennominae. London.
  (2008): Markku Savela's Lepidoptera and some other life forms: Ennominae. Version of June 24, 2010. Retrieved January 12, 2011.
  (2008): Characterisation of the Australian Nacophorini using adult morphology, and phylogeny of the Geometridae based on morphological characters. Zootaxa 1736: 1-141. PDF abstract and excerpt